Tejupá is a municipality in the state of São Paulo in Brazil. The population is 4,491 (2020 estimate) in an area of 296 km². The elevation is 765 m.

References

Municipalities in São Paulo (state)